Grete Olsen (18 February 1912 – 6 April 2010) was a Danish fencer. She competed in the women's individual foil event at the 1932, 1936 and 1948 Summer Olympics.

References

1912 births
2010 deaths
Danish female foil fencers
Olympic fencers of Denmark
Fencers at the 1932 Summer Olympics
Fencers at the 1936 Summer Olympics
Fencers at the 1948 Summer Olympics
Sportspeople from Copenhagen